The Wyoming Basin shrub steppe ecoregion, within the deserts and xeric shrublands biome, is a shrub steppe in the northwestern United States.

Setting
This Ecoregion is located almost entirely within the western and central portions of the US state of Wyoming, but does extend minimally into southeastern Idaho, south-central Montana, north-central Utah and northwestern Colorado. It is located within multiple high altitude intermontane basins largely surrounded by various subranges of the Rocky Mountains. These basins are in the rain shadow of the North American Cordillera and as such have an arid to semi-arid climate with long, very cold winters and short, hot summers.

Flora
The dominant vegetation of this ecoregion is sagebrush (Artemisia tridentata), often associated with various Agropyron species or fescue grass. At its upper altitudinal limit, the shrub steppe grades into the bordering mountain ecoregions, namely the South Central Rockies forests, the Colorado Rockies forests and the Wasatch and Uinta montane forests. Between mountain ranges, this ecoregion grades into the Northern short grasslands to the east and in a very small portion to the north, the Colorado Plateau shrublands to the south, and the Great Basin shrub steppe in a very small portion in the far west.

Fauna
Mammals in this ecoregion include elk (Cervus canadensis), white-tailed prairie dog (Cynomys leucurus), coyote (Canis latrans), swift fox (Vulpes velox), pronghorn (Antilocapra americana), bison (Bison bison bison) and black-footed ferret (Mustela nigripes).

Sagebrush-dependent bird species native to the region include the greater sage-grouse (Centrocercus urophasianus), sagebrush sparrow (Artemisiospiza nevadensis), Brewer's sparrow (Spizella breweri), and sage thrasher (Oreoscoptes montanus). Areas with less sagebrush cover often support grassland or semidesert species, such as long-billed curlew (Numenius americanus), western meadowlark (Sturnella neglecta), lark sparrow (Chondestes grammacus), vesper sparrow (Pooecetes gramineus), thick-billed longspur (Rhynchophanes mccownii), mountain plover (Charadrius montanus), or loggerhead shrike (Lanius ludovicianus).

Common reptiles in the area include the sagebrush lizard (Sceloporus graciosus), greater short-horned lizard or "horned toad" (Phrynosoma hernandesi), and prairie rattlesnake (Crotalus viridis viridis).

Conservation status
Though little of this ecoregion is protected, it is largely intact due to the harsh climate and resulting poor agricultural potential. However, heavy livestock grazing, fire suppression and the introduction of non-native plants (especially grasses) have resulted in some areas being significantly altered. These, along with oil and gas exploration and mining, are the most serious threats to this ecoregion's integrity.

See also
List of ecoregions in the United States (WWF)
Red Desert (Wyoming)
Sagebrush steppe
Bighorn Basin
Great Divide Basin

References

 - Wyoming Basin shrub steppe (National Geographic)

Deserts and xeric shrublands in the United States
Ecoregions of the United States
Nearctic ecoregions
Plant communities of the Western United States
Deserts of Wyoming
Deserts of Idaho
Deserts of Colorado
Deserts of Utah
 

 Wyoming Basin shrub steppe